Mangalore Airport  is located  west Mangalore, Victoria, Australia. The airport is about 2 hours north of Melbourne by road, and is home to Inbound Aviation (Mangalore Campus)

History
It was established in 1939 for training Royal Australian Air Force pilots. In 1947 it became a civil airfield and until 1970 it was an alternate for Essendon Airport.

From November 2007 to April 2009, the airport was home to the Australian Airline Pilot Academy (AAPA) owned by Regional Express Airlines. AAPA relocated to Wagga Airport, New South Wales in 2009.

In June 2017 to January 2023 Moorabbin Aviation Services Pty Ltd established a campus at Mangalore Airport where they undertake pilot training of international students.  One of their major clients being China Southern Airlines, training their airline cadets.

In February 2023 Inbound Aviation established a campus at Mangalore Airport were they undertake pilot training of Australian students.
Inbound Aviation continues to grow and is quickly becoming One of Australia's finest and professional Pilot Academy's too many Airlines.

Accidents and incidents
 On 29 December 1948, an empty Australian National Airways Douglas DC-3 from Launceston crashed short of the runway after diverting from Essendon. The aircraft was badly damaged but the crew was unhurt.
 On 31 October 1954, the first Vickers Viscount aircraft delivered to Australia crashed on take-off for a training flight only days after its arrival in Australia, killing 3 of the 7 people on board.
 On 19 February 2020 a Piper PA-44-180 and a Beechcraft D95A collided mid-air resulting in four fatalities, the wreckage of the PA-44-180 landed to the south of the Hume Freeway and the Beech D95A to the north.

See also
 List of airports in Victoria

References

Airports in Victoria (Australia)